"It's Lonely I Can't Stand" is a single by Canadian country music artist Charlie Major. Released in 1996, it was the third single from Major's album Lucky Man. The song reached #1 on the RPM Country Tracks chart in May 1996.

Chart performance

Year-end charts

References

1996 singles
Charlie Major songs
Songs written by Charlie Major
Songs written by Barry Brown (Canadian musician)
1995 songs
Arista Records singles